A London Symphony is the second symphony composed by Ralph Vaughan Williams. The work is sometimes referred to as Symphony No. 2, though the composer did not designate that name for the work. First performed in 1914, the original score of this four-movement symphony was lost and subsequently reconstructed. Vaughan Williams continued revisions of the work into its final definitive form, which was published in 1936.

Instrumentation
The work is scored for:
 Woodwinds: three flutes (the third doubling piccolo), two oboes, cor anglais, two clarinets, bass clarinet, two bassoons, contrabassoon
 Brass: four horns, two trumpets, two cornets, three trombones, tuba
 Percussion: timpani, bass drum, snare drum, triangle, tam-tam, sleigh bells, cymbals, glockenspiel
 Strings: harp, and strings.

Structure
Vaughan Williams said that while the title may suggest a programmatic piece (and the work includes sounds heard in London such as the Westminster Quarters), it was intended to be heard as absolute music. In a programme note in 1920, he suggested that Symphony by a Londoner might be a better title. However, he allowed the conductor Albert Coates to provide elaborate descriptions for the 1920 performance.

The symphony is in four movements.

1. Lento – Allegro risoluto 
The symphony opens quietly, and after a few nocturnal bars, the Westminster chimes are heard, played on the harp.

After a silent pause, the allegro risoluto section, much of it triple forte, is vigorous and brisk, and the ensuing second subject, dominated by the wind and brass, is no less so (evoking "Hampstead Heath on an August Bank Holiday"  and referencing ‘have a banana’ from the popular song Let's All Go Down the Strand – written a few years earlier).

 

After a contrasting gentle interlude scored for string sextet and harp, the vigorous themes return and bring the movement to a lively close, with full orchestra playing fortissimo.

2. Lento 
The movement opens with muted strings playing ppp. Vaughan Williams said that the slow movement is intended to evoke "Bloomsbury Square on a November afternoon".

Quiet themes led in turn by cor anglais, flute, trumpet and viola give way to a grave, impassioned forte section, after which the movement gradually subsides to its original quiet dynamic.

3. Scherzo (Nocturne) 
In the composer's words, "If the listener will imagine himself standing on Westminster Embankment at night, surrounded by the distant sounds of The Strand, with its great hotels on one side and the "New Cut" on the other, with its crowded streets and flaring lights, it may serve as a mood in which to listen to this movement." In the definitive score, the movement revolves around two scherzo themes, the first marked fugato and the second straightforward and lively.

The piece closes with muted strings playing pppp.

4. Finale – Andante con moto – Maestoso alla marcia – Allegro – Lento – Epilogue 

The finale opens on a grave march theme, punctuated with a lighter allegro section, with full orchestra initially forte and appassionato. After the reappearance of the march, the main allegro theme of the first movement returns. Following this, the Westminster Chimes strike again, this time the harp plays the first three-quarters of the hour chimes, and there is a quiet Epilogue, inspired by the last chapter of H. G. Wells's novel Tono-Bungay:

History and versions
The symphony was composed from 1912 to 1913. It is dedicated to Vaughan Williams's friend and fellow composer George Butterworth (1885–1916) who was subsequently killed by a sniper on the Somme during World War I. It was Butterworth who had first encouraged Vaughan Williams to write a purely orchestral symphony. Vaughan Williams recorded that:

The work was first performed on 27 March 1914 at Queen's Hall, conducted by Geoffrey Toye. The performance was a success. Shortly afterwards, the composer sent the score to the conductor Fritz Busch in Germany, and the original score disappeared in the upheaval of the outbreak of World War I.<ref>Kennedy, Michael, A Catalogue of the Works of Vaughan Williams', Oxford University Press, 1964, p. 73. Kennedy quotes a letter from the composer: "I think it was [Donald] Tovey who suggested I should send it to Busch"</ref> The second performance was given in Harrogate on 12 August 1914 by the Harrogate Municipal Orchestra under Julian Clifford. The composer, aided by Geoffrey Toye, Butterworth and the critic E. J. Dent, reconstructed the score from the orchestral parts, and the reconstruction was performed on 11 February 1915 by the Bournemouth Municipal Orchestra under Dan Godfrey.

The symphony went through several revisions before reaching its final form. Vaughan Williams revised it for a performance in March 1918, and again in 1919–1920. This second revision became the first published version, and was recorded for the gramophone in 1925 by the London Symphony Orchestra conducted by Sir Dan Godfrey. It was also recorded in 1941 by the Cincinnati Symphony Orchestra conducted by Sir Eugene Goossens. It had already received its American premiere on 20 December 1920 when the New York Symphony Orchestra played it under the baton of Albert Coates.

While he was working on his fourth symphony in 1933, Vaughan Williams made time to revise A London Symphony yet again. He regarded this version, which was published in 1936, as the definitive one, and it is this version that entered the repertoire, being played in concert and on record by many conductors.

In 2001, a new commercial recording appeared on Chandos of the original 1914 score, following assent from the composer's widow, Ursula Vaughan Williams, for a recording only, without live performances. The new recording of the original 1914 score attracted attention from various music critics, including some commentary that the composer had cut many bars of interesting music. Richard Tiedman commented:

Andrew Clements has separately remarked:

The main differences between the first and last versions may be summarised as follows:
 First movement: One bar was cut from the 1914 version.
 Slow movement: 52 bars of the 1914 score were cut in 1933/36, chiefly from the quiet coda.
 Scherzo: At the end of the original is a dark andantino passage, of which no trace survives in the definitive version.
 Finale: In the 1914 score, the central E minor section, familiar in the definitive text, is interrupted by an orchestral "cry of anguish" based on the opening theme, after which the allegro resumes. After the conclusion of the allegro section, the 1914 score has a long andantino section for strings and woodwinds later dismissed by Vaughan Williams as "a bad hymn tune". Finally, the original Epilogue extends to 109 bars.

Below is a summary of the changes made between the original and the two published versions. It shows the number of bars in each movement and the total for the whole symphony:

The final version is more than twenty minutes shorter than the original, as some indicative timings show:

1914 version:
 London Symphony Orchestra/Richard Hickox: 61:19 (I: 15:04; II: 16:16; III: 11:04; IV: 18:50)
1920 revision:
 London Symphony Orchestra/Dan Godfrey (rec 1925): 44:39 (I:13:37: II:12:17; III: 7:07; IV: 11:45) [Godfrey had already recorded the first movement (very heavily cut) and second movement (complete) in 1923, with the same forces. However, this later recording is still not a complete performance, since he now cut 23 bars from the Epilogue in order that it would fit on to 12 sides. The cut was from 9 bars after T until W. This is exactly what the composer would later do for the 1933 final version, leaving the suspicion that he may have been influenced by Godfrey's recording.]Foreman, Lewis: booklet notes for Symposium reissue
 Cincinnati Symphony Orchestra/Eugene Goossens (rec 1941): 38:45 (I:11:06: II:9:22; III: 5:09; IV: 13:15) [This performance makes no cuts, but does not play the repeat in the third movement.]
1933/36 revision:
 Queen's Hall Orchestra/Sir Henry Wood (rec 1936): 37:09 (I:11:40: II:8:39; III: 5:21; IV: 10:49)
 London Philharmonic Orchestra/Sir Adrian Boult (rec 1971): 43:03 (I: 14:24; II: 9:32; III:7:07; IV:12:00)

The reception accorded to the Chandos recording of the 1914 score persuaded Ursula Vaughan Williams to allow a live performance of the original version. In November 2003, Richard Hickox conducted the original 1914 score with the London Symphony Orchestra at the Barbican, in the first live performance of this version since 1918. The Proms presented an additional live performance of the 1914 version on 19 July 2005, with Hickox conducting the BBC National Orchestra of Wales.

In his liner note commentary to the Chandos recording of the original version, Michael Kennedy placed the status of the original score as subordinate to the final 1936 published version:

Recordings
 Dan Godfrey – London Symphony Orchestra (LSO) – Columbia 78s L 1717–22 (24 April and 1 May 1925)
 Henry Wood – Queen's Hall Orchestra – Decca 78s X 114–8 (21–22 April 1936)
 Eugene Goossens – Cincinnati Symphony Orchestra – RCA Victor 78s 11 8375–8379 in set M 916 (19–20 Feb 1941)
 Dmitri Mitropoulos – NBC Symphony Orchestra (+ Malcolm Sargent's recording of Symphony No. 9) - Pristine Audio XR PASC 234 (Studio 8H, New York, 9 December 1945)
 Adrian Boult – London Philharmonic Orchestra (LPO) – Decca LXT 2693 (Kingsway Hall, 8–11 Jan 1952)
 John Barbirolli – Hallé – Pye Red Label CCL 30134 (Free Trade Hall, 28–29 Dec 1957)
 Malcolm Sargent – Chicago Symphony Orchestra (+ music by Copland + Schuman-W) - CSO CD 4677 00-07 (Ravinia, 6 July 1967)
 John Barbirolli – Hallé – HMV ASD 2360 (Abbey Road, London, 11–14 July 1967)
 Adrian Boult – LPO – HMV ASD 2740 (Kingsway Hall, 1–2 March 1971)
 Andre Previn – LSO – RCA Red Seal SB 6860 (Kingsway Hall, 6–7 Jan 1972)
 Vernon Handley – LPO – Classics for Pleasure CFP 40286 (Kingsway Hall, 5–6 Jan 1977)
 Andre Previn – Royal Philharmonic Orchestra ( + The Lark Ascending) - Telarc CD 80138 (Fairfield Halls, Croydon, 15–16 Sep 1986)
 Bernard Haitink – LPO (+ Fantasia on a Theme by Thomas Tallis) - EMI CDC 7 49394 2 (Abbey Road, 9 October 1986)
 Bryden Thomson – LSO (+ Concerto grosso) - Chandos CHAN 8629 (St Jude-on-the-Hill, Hampstead, 14–15 March 1988)
 Gennady Rozhdestvensky – USSR StSO – Melodiya CD 10-02170-2 (Philharmonia Building, Leningrad, 2 May 1988)
 Owain Arwel Hughes – Philharmonia (+ music by Elgar + Ireland) - ASV CD DCA 634 (St Peter's Church, Morden, 1–2 Dec 1988)
 Leonard Slatkin – Philharmonia (+ Norfolk Rhapsody No. 1 in e + Fantasia on a Theme by Thomas Tallis) - RCA Victor Red Seal 09026-61193-2 (Abbey Road, 1 June to 29 November 1991)
 Vernon Handley – Royal Liverpool Philharmonic Orchestra (RLPO) (+ Symphony No. 8) - EMI Eminence CD EMX 2209 (Philharmonic Hall, Liverpool, 3–4 March 1992)
 Andrew Davis – BBC SO (+ Symphony No. 8) - Teldec 4509-90858-2 (St Augustine's Church, London, March 1993)
 Kees Bakels – Bournemouth Symphony Orchestra (+ Overture to The Wasps) - Naxos 8.550734 (Poole Arts Centre, 5–6 April 1993)
 Roger Norrington – LPO ( + Fantasia on a Theme by Thomas Tallis + Serenade to Music) - Decca 467 047-2 (25–27 Nov 1996)
 Richard Hickox (original 1914 score)– LSO (+ music by Butterworth) - Chandos CHAN 9902 (19 Dec 2000)
 Christopher Seaman – Melbourne SO (+ music by Chopin + Dukas) - ABC Classics 476 8363 (Hamer Hall, Melbourne, 6–7 May 2005)
 Mark Elder – Hallé – (+ Oboe Concerto) - Hallé CD HLL 7529 (Bridgewater Hall, 14 October 2010)
 Christopher Seaman – Rochester Philharmonic Orchestra (+ Serenade to Music) - Harmonia Mundi HMU 807567 (March 2011)
 Martin Yates (1920 version) – Royal Scottish National Orchestra (+ Concerto in C for 2 Pianos and Orchestra) - Dutton Epoch CDLX 7322 (13 Jan 2015)
 Andrew Manze – RLPO (+ Symphony No. 8) - Onyx 4155 (Philharmonic Hall, Liverpool, 29–30 March 2015)
 Martyn Brabbins (1920 version) – BBC SO (+ Sound Sleep + Orpheus With His Lute + Variations for Brass Band'') - Hyperion CDA 68190 (Henry Wood Hall, Nov. 2016)
 Lynn Arnold & Charles Matthews (pianos). Arrangement of 1920 version for piano duet by Archibald Jacob. Albion ALBCD046 (2021)

References

Symphonies by Ralph Vaughan Williams
1913 compositions
1918 compositions
1920 compositions
1933 compositions
Music about London